Mińsk may refer to:

 Minsk, capital city of Belarus, known in Polish as Mińsk, formerly also as Mińsk Litewski or Mińsk Białoruski
 Mińsk Mazowiecki, a town in eastern Poland

See also 
 Minsk (disambiguation)